Eight teams competed in the women's football tournament at the 1996 Summer Olympics. In addition to the host nation, the United States, seven other teams qualified for the tournament based on the results from the 1995 FIFA Women's World Cup.

Method
Unlike the men's competition, there was no fixed slot allocation for the women's tournament. Instead, the 1995 FIFA Women's World Cup would be used as the preliminary competition to qualify teams for the inaugural women's Olympic football tournament, which featured eight teams. The United States automatically qualified for the tournament as hosts, leaving seven spots to be determined by the Women's World Cup. Teams were ranked based on their results in the tournament, with the top seven teams in the ranking qualifying for the Olympics (excluding the United States and England, a non-IOC member).

1995 FIFA Women's World Cup

Qualification

Twelve teams qualified for the 1995 FIFA Women's World Cup in Sweden based on a fixed slot allocation.

Group stage

Ranking of third-placed teams

Knockout stage

Ranking of teams

Teams were ranked by the round/place which they reached, and then by points, goal difference and goals scored. Teams eliminated in the quarter-finals are ranked by their quarter-final goal differential. Per statistical convention in football, matches decided in extra time are counted as wins and losses, while matches decided by penalty shoot-outs are counted as draws.

Qualified teams

Breakdown by confederation
No teams from Africa (CAF) or Oceania (OFC) managed to qualify for the Olympic tournament.

References

External links
Olympic Football Tournaments Atlanta 1996 – Women, FIFA.com

Qualification